Harpides is an extinct genus of harpetid trilobite of the family Harpididae.

Sources 
 Trilobite info (Sam Gon III)

External links
''Another Harpides sp.'
 Trilobite info (Sam Gon III)

Harpetida
Devonian trilobites
Fossils of Argentina
Fossils of Sweden
Paleozoic life of Alberta
Paleozoic life of Newfoundland and Labrador